St. Clare or St. Claire's Monastery may refer to:

 St. Clare's Monastery, Copenhagen, in Denmark (1497–1536)
 St. Clare's Monastery (Duncan), in British Columbia (1912–present)
 Abbey of the Minoresses of St. Clare without Aldgate, in England (c.1290–1539)
 Monastery Saint Claire, in Nazareth, Israel
 Monastery of Santa Clara-a-Nova, in Portugal (1677–present)
 Monastery of Santa Clara-a-Velha, in Portugal (1330–1677)
 Any monastery of the Order of St. Clare, worldwide

See also
 :Category:Poor Clare monasteries
 St. Clare's Convent (disambiguation)